The Controversy Tour was a concert tour by American recording artist Prince in support of his fourth studio album Controversy. The tour included Zapp and Roger and The Time as an opening act.

History
The Controversy Tour marked the debut of Mark Brown, a.k.a. Brown Mark, on bass guitar, replacing the departed André Cymone, and the introduction of Prince's new bodyguard, Chick Huntsberry. At first, Prince contemplated dismissing the huge Huntsberry after only being on tour with him for a few days, as Prince thought he was too big and he scared him. Guitarist Dez Dickerson talked him out of it and he eventually became a confidant to Prince and later appeared in Purple Rain as a bouncer. This tour was also notable for  Prince's new side group The Time joining him on tour and the resulting backstage drama and arising tension that developed between the two bands.

Although The Time became superstars overnight with their debut album, The Time, they were frustrated at the lack of input they contributed to the album as, with the exception of Morris Day, they did not write or play their own music and were only being paid as a live act. During the tour, The Time would put on such a great show during their set that it began to worry Prince just how good they had become and with them performing right before his set, began to feel they were outshining him, so much so, that during the 1982–1983 1999 Tour, he kicked them off the tour for being so good.

The conflict came to a head on the final night of the tour in Cincinnati as during The Time's set, Prince and some of the members in his band began egging them from off stage. Near the end of the set, they grabbed Jerome Benton from the stage and proceeded to "tar and feather" him by pouring honey all over him and dumping trash on him. Things got further escalated after The Time's performance, guitarist Jesse Johnson was handcuffed to a wall-mounted coat rack and further humiliated with Prince throwing Doritos and other food at him. When The Time went to retaliate, they were stopped by the tour manager and told there would be no interruptions during Prince's performance, but as soon as he left the stage, a food fight erupted between the two bands. When the battle continued at the hotel causing damage, Prince made Morris Day pay for all damages, claiming that he had started the whole thing.

Opening acts
 The Time
 Zapp featuring Roger

Set list
November 20, 1981 at the Stanley Theatre, Pittsburgh, Pennsylvania

"The Second Coming"
"Sexuality"
"Why You Wanna Treat Me So Bad?"
"Jack U Off"
"When You Were Mine"
"I Wanna Be Your Lover"
"Head"
"Annie Christian"
"Dirty Mind"
"Do Me, Baby"
"Let's Work"
"Controversy "
"Uptown"
"Partyup"
January 30, 1982 at the Capitol Theatre, Passaic, New Jersey

"The Second Coming"
"Uptown"
"Why You Wanna Treat Me So Bad?"
"I Wanna Be Your Lover"
"Head"
"Dirty Mind"
"Do Me, Baby"
"Controversy"
"Let's Work"
"Jack U Off"

Tour dates
Prior to the tour, in October 1981 Prince played two shows at the Los Angeles Memorial Coliseum as an opening act for The Rolling Stones. On the first date, Prince and his band did not finish their set, as the crowd turned hostile towards him. Dressed in his controversial bikini briefs and trench coat, and singing his sexually androgynous lyrics, he was run off stage after 25 minutes of the crowd booing, throwing shoes and beer bottles at him. Off stage, security escorted Prince to his trailer, they described him as emotionally distraught and crying softly. He was later heard cussing at his band and swearing he would never open for the Rolling Stones again.

After the show, Prince immediately flew back home to Minneapolis. After speaking with Dez Dickerson, manager Steve Fargnoli, and Mick Jagger himself, they convinced him to return for the second concert. Amidst the same hostility, as The Rolling Stones' fans heard about the incident at the first concert and came prepared to dog Prince again, Prince and his band finished their set this time. Backstage, Prince referred to the crowd as, "Tasteless in music and mentally retarded."

The band
 Prince: Lead vocals, Synthesizer and guitar
 Dez Dickerson: Guitar
 Brown Mark: Bass
 Matt Fink: Keyboards
 Lisa Coleman: Keyboards
 Bobby Z.: Drums

References

External links
Controversy Tour|Prince-Live

Prince (musician) concert tours
1981 concert tours
1982 concert tours